The RRG Fafnir, named after the legendary dragon, was a single seat German high performance glider designed by Alexander Lippisch.  It won the Rhön competition in 1931 and made several outstanding flights as well as setting a fashion for gull wings.

Design and development

Lippisch began the design of the influential Fafnir in 1929.  Its refined design proved difficult to construct and the aircraft was only just ready for flight tests at the start of the 1930 Rhön competition on the Wasserkuppe.

The Fafnir was not the first glider with a cantilever wing, for the Darmstadt Konsul had been built seven years earlier but a cantilever wing with an aspect ratio of almost 20 was exceptional. The single wing spar had to be deep for strength and Lippisch accommodated this by using the Göttingen 652 airfoil which is thick and strongly cambered, additionally providing lift at low speeds.  The wing root was faired into the upper fuselage. The wing was straight tapered in plan to elliptical tips and the profile changed along the span through the less cambered, more widely used Göttingen 535 to the familiar Clarke Y profile with washout at the tips to prevent tip stalling. It was plywood covered ahead of the spar, with fabric covering aft.  Laterally stabilising dihedral was not common on gliders in 1929 but Lippisch applied it to about 40% of the inner span  on the Fafnir, producing a gull wing. Many later gliders followed this form, though it is harder to build and has no solid aerodynamic justification.  The trailing edges of the outer part of the wing carried broad and constant chord ailerons.

The Fafnir's fuselage was oval in cross section, carefully streamlined with a ply skin and becoming slender behind the wing. The cockpit was just ahead of the wing and originally enclosed in a ply covered faring with only two side apertures for vision.  Later this fairing was replaced with a stepped and fully glazed canopy.   All the tail surfaces were fabric covered:  an all-moving tapered elevator with an unswept leading edge was mounted on the fuselage mid-line below a small, straight edged fin which carried a large, rounded rudder mounted at the keel and moving in a shallow elevator cut-out.  Launching accidents showed this exposed low mounting to be a dangerous weakness. A skid, running from the nose to under the wing trailing edge acted as an undercarriage.

Operational history

The Fafnir had only just begun test flights at the start of the  Rhön competition held in August 1930, when wing root turbulence was found to reduce performance.

Despite several launching accidents in the Alps early in the new year, 1931 was a successful period for Groenhoff and the Fafnir. Because of the tow launch this was not officially recognised but a bungee launched,  flight, made between the Wasserkuppe and Magdeburg in late August did set a new record. Groenhoff was overall winner at the 1931 Rhön competition. He was killed in the Fafnir at the 1932 Rhön in another rudder related launching accident.

In 1934 it was taken to South America and flown for over seven hours over Buenos Aires. On return it continued to fly from its Darmstadt home until retired to a Berlin museum, where it was destroyed by bombing in World War II.

Specifications

References

External links
Göttingen 652 airfoil
Göttingen 635 airfoil
Clarke Y airfoil

1930s German sailplanes
Glider aircraft
Gull-wing aircraft
Aircraft first flown in 1930